Purusha is a complex concept whose meaning evolved in Vedic and Upanishadic times. Depending on source and historical timeline, it means the cosmic being or self, awareness, and universal principle. 

In early Vedas, Purusha was a cosmic being whose sacrifice by the gods created all life. This was one of many creation myths discussed in the Vedas. In the Upanishads, the Purusha concept refers to the abstract essence of the Self, Spirit and the Universal Principle that is eternal, indestructible, without form, and is all-pervasive. 

In Sankhya philosophy, Purusha is the plural immobile cosmic principle, pure consciousness, unattached and unrelated to anything, which is “nonactive, unchanging, eternal, and pure”. Purusha uniting with Prakṛti (matter) gives rise to life.

In Kashmir Shaivism, Purusha is enveloped in five sheaths of time (Kāla), desire (Raga), restriction (Niyati), knowledge (Vidya) and portion of time (Kalā); it is the universal Self (Paramatman) under limitations as many individual Selfs (Jīvātman).

Definition and general meaning
There is no consensus among schools of Hinduism on the definition of Purusha, and it is left to each school and individual to reach their own conclusions. For example, one of many theistic traditions script such as Kapilasurisamvada, credited to another ancient Hindu philosopher named Kapila, first describes Purusha in a manner similar to Samkhya-Yoga schools, but then proceeds to describe buddhi (intellect) as second Purusha, and ahamkara (egoism) as third Purusha. Such pluralism and diversity of thought within Hinduism implies that the term Purusha is a complex term with diverse meanings.

The animating causes, fields, and principles of nature are Purusha in Hindu philosophy. Hinduism refers to Purusha as the soul of the universe, the universal spirit present everywhere, in everything and everyone, all the time. Purusha is the Universal Principle that is eternal, indestructible, without form, and all-pervasive. It is Purusha in the form of nature’s laws and principles that operate in the background to regulate, guide, and direct change, evolution, cause, and effect. It is Purusha, in the Hindu concept of existence, that breathes life into matter, is the source of all consciousness, one that creates oneness in all life forms, in all of humanity, and the essence of Self. According to Hinduism, it is Purusha why the universe operates, is dynamic and evolves, as against being static.

Vedas
During the Vedic period, the Purusha concept was one of several mythemes offered for the creation of the universe. Purusa, in the Rigveda, was described as a being who becomes a sacrificial victim of the gods, and whose sacrifice creates all life forms including human beings.

In the RigVeda, "[t]his Puruṣa is all that yet hath been and all that is to be" (पुरुष एवेदग्ं सर्वं यद्भूतं यच्च भव्यम्|).

Varna system

In the Purusha Sukta, the 90th hymn of the 10th book of the Rigveda, Varna is portrayed as a result of human beings created from different parts of the body of the divinity Purusha. This Purusha Sukta verse is controversial and is believed by many scholars, such as Max Müller, to be a corruption and medieval or modern era insertion into Veda,  because unlike all other major concepts in the Vedas including those of Purusha, the four varnas are never mentioned anywhere else in any of the Vedas, and because this verse is missing in some manuscript prints found in different parts of India.

Upanishads
The abstract idea Purusha is extensively discussed in various Upanishads, and referred interchangeably as Paramatman and Brahman (not to be confused with Brahmin). In the Upanishads and later texts of Hindu philosophy, the Purusha concept moved away from the Vedic definition of Purusha and was no longer a person, cosmic man or entity. Instead, the concept flowered into a more complex abstraction:

In the Upanishads, the Purusha concept refers to the abstract essence of the Self, Spirit and the Universal Principle that is eternal, indestructible, without form and is all pervasive. The Purusha concept is explained with the concept of Prakrti in the Upanishads. The Universe is envisioned in these ancient Sanskrit texts as a combination of the perceivable material reality and non-perceivable, non-material laws and principles of nature. Material reality (or Prakrti) is everything that has changed, can change and is subject to cause and effect. Purusha is the Universal principle that is unchanging, uncaused but is present everywhere and the reason why Prakrti changes, transforms and transcends all of the time and which is why there is cause and effect.

Rishi Angiras of the Atma Upanishad belonging to the Atharvaveda explains that Purusha, the dweller in the body, is three-fold: the Bahyatman (the Outer-Atman) which is born and dies; the Antaratman (the Inner-Atman) which comprehends the whole range of material phenomena, gross and subtle, with which the Jiva concerns himself, and the Paramatman which is all-pervading, unthinkable, indescribable, is without action and has no Samskaras.

In Samkhya and Yoga 
Both Samkhya, a school of Hindu philosophy that considers reason, as against Nyaya school's logic or Mīmāṃsā school's tradition, as the proper source of knowledge, and Yoga philosophy state that there are two ultimate realities whose interaction accounts for all experiences and universe, namely Purusha (spirit) and Prakrti (matter). The universe is envisioned as a combination of perceivable material reality and non-perceivable, non-material laws and principles of nature. Material reality, or Prakrti, is everything that has changed, can change and is subject to cause and effect. Universal principle, or Purusha, is that which is unchanging (aksara) and is uncaused. 

Puruṣa is the transcendental self or pure consciousness. It is absolute, independent, free, imperceptible, unknowable through other agencies, above any experience by mind or senses and beyond any words or explanations. It remains pure, "nonattributive consciousness". Puruṣa is neither produced nor does it produce. It is held that unlike Advaita Vedanta and like Purva-Mīmāṃsā, Samkhya believes in a plurality of the puruṣas.

Yoga philosophy holds that, in addition to the purusha of each individual, there is a special purusha called Ishvara, which is free of all kleshas and karmas.

Both Samkhya and Yoga school holds that the path to moksha (release, Self-realization) includes the realization of Purusha.

Puranas
In the Puranas, "The Bhagavata Purana and the Mahabharata boldly proclaim Vishnu as ultimate Purusha described in Purusha Sukta prayer", whereas Shiva  is described as ultimate Purusha (cosmic male) in Shiva Purana. According to Indologist W. Norman Brown, "The verses of Purusha Sukta are definitely a reference to Vishnu, who, through his three steps, is all-pervading (i.e. he spreads in all directions)".

The Bhagavata Purana explains the origin of the four varnas from the body of Purusha, identified as Vishnu:

Vedanta

Brahma Sutras
The Brahma Sutras state , meaning that 'The Absolute Truth is that from which everything else emanates' Bhagavata Purana [S.1.1.1].

See also

 Brahman
 Hindu deities
 Hindu idealism
 Hindu mythology
 Indian caste system
 Kingu
 Pangu
 Spirit
 Vishnu
 Adam Kadmon
 Adam kasia

Notes

References

Sources

 
 
 

Hindu philosophical concepts
Rigvedic deities